The 2000/2001 season in Dutch football was the 45th season in the Eredivisie, where PSV Eindhoven claimed the title, while FC Twente won the Dutch National Cup.

Johan Cruijff-schaal

Eredivisie

Champions League : PSV
Champions League qualification : Feyenoord
UEFA Cup : Ajax, Roda JC, Utrecht and Twente
Promotion / relegation play-offs ("Nacompetitie") : Fortuna Sittard and Sparta Rotterdam
Relegated : RBC Roosendaal

Top scorers

Awards

Dutch Footballer of the Year
 2000–01 — Mark van Bommel (PSV)

Dutch Golden Shoe Winner
 2000 — Jerzy Dudek (Feyenoord)
 2001 — Johann Vogel (PSV)

PSV winning squad 2000–01

Goal
 Gino Coutinho
 Ivica Kralj
 Patrick Lodewijks
 Ronald Waterreus

Defence
 Eric Addo
 Kasper Bøgelund
 Wilfred Bouma
 Jürgen Dirkx
 Ernest Faber
 Kevin Hofland
 Yuri Nikiforov

 André Ooijer
 Nuelson Wau
 Chris van der Weerden

Midfield
 Mark van Bommel
 Björn van der Doelen
 Robert Fuchs
 Giorgi Gakhokidze
 John de Jong
 Joonas Kolkka
 Theo Lucius
 Marquinho
 Adil Ramzi

 Dennis Rommedahl
 Ovidiu Stinga
 Johann Vogel

Attack
 Arnold Bruggink
 Claudio
 Mateja Kežman
 Ruud van Nistelrooy

Management
 Eric Gerets (Coach)
 Ernie Brandts (Assistant)

Eerste Divisie

Promoted : FC Den Bosch
Promotion / Relegation play-offs ("Nacompetitie") : Excelsior, Zwolle, Cambuur, Volendam, Go Ahead Eagles and SC Telstar

Topscorers

Promotion and relegation

Group A

Group B

Stayed : Fortuna Sittard and Sparta Rotterdam

KNVB Cup

Dutch national team

References
 RSSSF Archive
 RDFC.com